The Fiji National Netball Team better known at the Fijian Pearls represents Fiji in international netball competition. Fiji have competed at nine World Netball Championships, finishing sixth in their best placing at the 1999 tournament. They have also competed at two Commonwealth Games, and won the netball event at the South Pacific Games for a number of years. They have won gold at every games since 1991. They are also the current Pacific Champions, winning the all Pacific Series since its inception.

As of 21 July 2019, the Fijian team are Seventeenth in the INF World Rankings. They were captained by Matila Waqanidrola, and coached by Gabriel Qoro and Unaisi Rokoura.

The Fiji National Netball Team are now known as the Fijian Pearls after securing their sponsorship in May 2013 with The Pearl South Pacific Resort. The Fijian Pearls are currently under the coaching guidance of Unaisi Rokoura and new team manager, Lusiani Rokoura. The Fiji Pearls hosted 5th ranked Malawi to a 2-test match in Suva on 2 and 4 November 2013.

Players

2019 Fiji Pearls Netball World Cup Team

Notable past players
 Vilimaina Davu
 Matila Waqanidrola
 Afa Rusivakula

Competitive history

See also

 Netball in Fiji

References

External links
Fiji Netball Association

Netball
National netball teams of Oceania
Netball in Fiji